Robert Tycko is an American biophysicist whose research primarily involves solid state NMR, including the development of new methods and applications to various areas of physics, chemistry, and biology.  He is a member of the Laboratory of Chemical Physics in the National Institute of Diabetes and Digestive and Kidney Diseases at the National Institutes of Health in Bethesda, Maryland, USA. He was formerly a member of the Physical Chemistry Research and Materials Chemistry Research departments of AT&T Bell Labs in Murray Hill, New Jersey.  His work has contributed to our understanding of geometric phases in spectroscopy, physical properties of fullerenes, skyrmions in 2D electron systems, protein folding, and amyloid fibrils associated with Alzheimer’s disease and prions.

Education
Tycko received his bachelor's degree from Princeton University, where he majored in chemistry. He received his Ph.D. in chemistry from the University of California at Berkeley, under the direction of Alexander Pines, and then did postdoctoral research at the University of Pennsylvania in the laboratory of Prof. Stanley J. Opella.

Selected honors
1997: Fellow of American Physical Society 
2001: NIH Director’s Award
2005: Fellow of the American Association for the Advancement of Science
2005: Earle K. Plyler Prize for Molecular Spectroscopy, American Physical Society
2007: Hillebrand Prize, Chemical Society of Washington
2008: Fellow of the International Society of Magnetic Resonance
2014: Christian B. Anfinsen Award of the Protein Society
2020: Elected Member of the United States National Academy of Sciences

References

Year of birth missing (living people)
Living people
American biophysicists
Princeton University alumni
University of Pennsylvania people
National Institutes of Health people
Fellows of the American Association for the Advancement of Science
University of California, Berkeley alumni
Fellows of the American Physical Society